

Standings
standings as of February 16, 2009

Biathlon World Cup - Nations Cup Men, 2008-09